Kole is a town in Northern Uganda. It is the main municipal, administrative and commercial center of Kole District. The district is named after the town.

Location
The coordinates of Kole, Uganda are:2°25'43.0"N, 32°48'04.0"E (Latitude:2.428600; Longitude:32.801123).

Points of interest
The following points of interest are found in Kole:

 The headquarters of Kole District Administration
 The offices of Kole Town Council
 Kole Central Market.

See also
Northern Region, Uganda

References

External links
  Kole District Chairman Turns Official Vehicle Into Ambulance

Populated places in Northern Region, Uganda
Cities in the Great Rift Valley
Kole District
Lango sub-region